Srejović is a Serbian surname. Notable people with the surname include:

Dragoslav Srejović (1931–1996), Serbian archaeologist and anthropologist
Miloš Srejović (born 1956), Serbian triple jumper

Serbian surnames